"I Could Not Love You More" is a song by the Bee Gees. It was the second single issued from their multi-platinum album, Still Waters, released in 1997. The song is a pop ballad written by Barry, Robin and Maurice Gibb and recorded in Los Angeles in March 1996. The track was produced by the Gibb brothers and David Foster. The track was a moderate hit worldwide, peaking at #14 in the UK and appearing in serious charts all over Europe.

Critical reception
British magazine Music Week rated the song three out of five, writing, "The Gibb brothers tremble through a gentle ballad. It's sweet, but unlikely to match the success of Alone."

Music video
The song's accompanying music video for "I Could Not Love You More" shows the band singing in a black background and on a street, intercut with scenes of a relationship between a man and a woman. It also features two young kids, a boy and a girl, on a pier.

Track listings
 UK CD single 1
"I Could Not Love You More" - 3:43
"Love Never Dies" - 4:05 (An exclusive brand new song for the single)
BRIT Awards Medley - 7:26 (Recorded on 24 February 1997 at the BRIT Awards Ceremony in London, including the songs "To Love Somebody", "Massachusetts", "Words", "How Deep Is Your Love", "Jive Talkin'", "Stayin' Alive", and "You Should Be Dancing")

 UK CD single 2
"I Could Not Love You More" - 3:43
"Jive Talkin'" - 2:50 (Recorded on 25 November 1996 at Coral Gables, in a special performance for the VH1 Storytellers Specials)
"To Love Somebody" - 3:09 (Also from VH1 Storytellers)
"Stayin' Alive" (1996) - 4:06 (A re-recording of "Stayin' Alive")

Charts

Cover versions
The Brazilian group KLB recorded a version in Portuguese entitled "Te Amar Ainda Mais", recorded the album "KLB 2001" and released as a second single, reaching # 2 in Brazil.

References

Bee Gees songs
Songs written by Barry Gibb
Songs written by Robin Gibb
Songs written by Maurice Gibb
1997 singles
Song recordings produced by David Foster